The  is a railway line operated by West Japan Railway Company (JR West) connecting  and  in Okayama Prefecture, Japan.

Stations
All-stations  and limited-stop  services called  operate over the line. In the "Rapid" column in the table below, "O" indicates stations at which "Rapid" services stop.

Some Rapid services also stop at Nonokuchi and Takebe stations.

History
It was nationalized on 1 June 1944, becoming part of the Japanese National Railways (JNR) system, and from 1 April 1987, with the privatization of JNR, it was transferred to the control of West Japan Railway Company (JR West).

See also
 List of railway lines in Japan

References

Rail transport in Okayama Prefecture
Lines of West Japan Railway Company
1067 mm gauge railways in Japan
Railway lines opened in 1898